Yang Mulia Tengku Sri Kelana D'Raja Dato' Sri Raja Shah Zurin bin Raja Aman Shah (born 26 January 1961), better known as Shah Rezza  is a Malaysian actor. He gained fame in his acting career in the 1980s, and is best known for films, including Ali Setan (1985), Marah-Marah Sayang (1987) and Kolej 56 (1989).

His appearance in the field of acting, contemporaneous with Sabree Fadzil, Ridzuan Hashim, Mustapha Kamal, Liza Abdullah, Ogy Ahmad Daud and Raja Noor Baizura.

Early life
Shah Rezza was born on 26 January 1961 in Perak and is the youngest brother of two siblings.

Career  
Shah Rezza began his career as a model at the age of 14 in the 1970s.

He then continued his career in the entertainment industry in 1981 in the film Mangsa. His famous involvement in the film industry, however, only began in 1985 when he was discovered by Tan Sri Jins Shamsuddin, and was cast in his film; Ali Setan. Then, he was cast with Dato' M. Nasir and Pyan Habib in the film Kembara Seniman Jalanan directed by Nasir Jani in 1986.

During the 1980s, Shah Rezza teamed up with other stars like Uji Rashid, Ahmad Fauzee, Faizal Hussein and others in RTM's entertainment shows Mekar Sejambak and Hiburan Minggu Ini.

In 1997, he turned music producer for the album titled Pedoman, which featured spiritual songs by fellow singer-actors Nassier Wahab, Ebby Saiful, Ahmad Fauzee and Syed Sobrie.

Shah Rezza developed his business acumen by forming his own company, Nusantara Gems, which planned the wedding of pop queen Dato' Sri Siti Nurhaliza and businessman Dato' Sri Khalid Mohamad Jiwa on 21 August 2006.

Since 2006, he has been organising the annual International Islamic Fashion Festival, a celebration of traditional and modern fashion, and its fusion with an Islamic theme.

Shah Rezza released a sequel album in 2013 titled Pedoman 2, which contained songs written and composed by Fauzi Marzuki, Habsah Hassan, Melly Goeslow, S. Atan and Akbar Nawab.

In addition to his career, he is also actively involved in business named Maharani D’Rimba Cafe and Maison Raja Rezza (An exclusive private function house), located in Kota Bharu, Kelantan.

Personal life
Shah Rezza comes from Perak Royal Family and was raised by the family of his stepmother, Dato' Tengku Salwani binti Almarhum Sultan Yahya Petra in Kelantan. He is a cousin of the Sultan of Kelantan Sultan Muhammad V.

His father, the Tengku Sri Kelana D'Raja Colonel (Rtd) Dato' Raja Aman Shah bin Raja Haji Shahar Shah died on 26 January 2018.

Filmography

Film

Television series

Telemovie

Television

Discography

Title and honours
In April 2022, Shah Rezza was conferred the title of Tengku Sri Kelana D’Raja by his cousin Sultan Muhammad V of Kelantan.

:
  Grand Knight of the Order of Sultan Ahmad Shah of Pahang (Darjah Kebesaran Sri Sultan Ahmad Shah Pahang) - Dato' Sri (24 October 2012)
  Knight Companion of the Order of Sultan Ahmad Shah of Pahang (Darjah Kebesaran Sultan Ahmad Shah Pahang) - Dato' (2011)
  Knight Companion of the Esteemed Order of the Crown of Pahang (Darjah Kebesaran Mahkota Pahang Yang Dihormati)  - Dato' (2003)
:
  Knight Grand Commander of the Order of the Life of the Crown of Kelantan (Darjah Kebesaran Seri Paduka Jiwa Mahkota Kelantan Yang Amat Mulia) - Dato' (4 March 2019)

References

External links
 

1961 births
Living people
Malaysian people of Malay descent
Malaysian Muslims
People from Kota Bharu
Malaysian male actors
21st-century Malaysian people